Birsa Munda Tribal University is a university at Rajpipla, Narmada in the Indian state of Gujarat. Established on 4 Oct 2014, after its formal inauguration by the then Minister of State for Tribal Welfare, Shabdasharan Tadvi.

History
Birsa Munda Tribal University in the tribal dominated Rajpipla, Narmada district about 1km from Narmada.

Academics
University offers graduation, courses covering the subjects of Arts, Commerce, Science,

References

Universities in Gujarat
Narmada district
Educational institutions established in 2014
2014 establishments in Gujarat